"Tigh Me Up, Tigh Me Down" is the ninth episode of the reimagined Battlestar Galactica television series. Its script was originally titled "Secrets and Lies".

Actor Edward James Olmos, who portrays Commander Adama on the show, directed this episode.

Plot
Suspecting that Commander Adama may be a Cylon agent due to recent odd behaviour, President Roslin tells Dr. Baltar that Adama should be the first person to undergo the now-functioning "Cylon Detector" blood test, a process that takes eleven hours to complete.

A lone Cylon Raider appears when Adama is suspiciously off-ship.  A combat air patrol disarms it, but Col. Tigh deploys a Raptor to gather data on the enemy.  Shortly after, Adama appears with Tigh's estranged wife, Ellen, who everyone thought had died in the initial Cylon attacks.  Adama is suspicious of her sudden appearance and orders Dr. Baltar to put her blood test ahead of anyone else's.

After dinner with the reunited couple, where Ellen shrugs off Adama and Roslin's questions about her sudden reappearance, Commander Adama and Apollo go to Baltar's lab to check on her test results.  A harried Baltar explains that Adama's and Roslin's conflicting orders have prompted him to switch between the tests twice already, delaying results. Tigh barges in and (prompted by Ellen) accuses Adama of pursuing his wife sexually.  The shouting is interrupted by a call from CIC that the Cylon Raider has changed course, seemingly to make a kamikaze dive towards Galactica.  Since Tigh had already launched Vipers on a hunch, the Raider is destroyed and the fleet saved. Adama congratulates, then asks Tigh not to let anything (like his erratic wife) compromise his performance or let anything separate their friendship.

When her test finishes, Baltar declares Ellen to be a non-Cylon.  Afterwards, however, talking to Number Six, Baltar refuses to confirm to her whether or not these were the real results.

Back on Caprica, Helo and Sharon avoid capture by running through a sewer system.  At Sharon's suggestion, they head to the city of Delphi where they can find a ship and escape off Caprica.

External links
 "Tigh Me Up, Tigh Me Down" at the Battlestar Wiki
 "Tigh Me Up, Tigh Me Down" at Syfy
 

2004 American television episodes
Battlestar Galactica (season 1) episodes